Whitney Nees Able (born June 2, 1982) is an American actress and model. She is best known for her roles in All the Boys Love Mandy Lane (2006) and Monsters (2010), and has been featured in Maxim magazine.

Early life
Whitney Able was born in Houston, Texas. She has two brothers. She has lived in Spain and Mexico and is fond of the Spanish language. She also attended St. Andrew's Sewanee School in Franklin County, TN.

Career
Able's acting career started with a role in the low-budget film Age of Kali in 2005. She then portrayed Eve in the film Dead Lenny, which was released direct-to-DVD in 2006. She then gained a role in the pilot of the TV show Secrets of a Small Town; however the show was not picked up by American Broadcasting Company. She also had a role on the ABC show Rodney.

Able's breakout role was in the 2006 horror film All the Boys Love Mandy Lane, portraying the bitchy but also sympathetic cheerleader Chloe. The film co-starred Amber Heard and received mixed reviews from critics. Able then appeared in guest roles in television series including CSI: New York, Cold Case. Her next film role came in Emmanuelle Vaugier's horror vehicle Unearthed, in which she plays Ally. The film was one of the 8 films to die for at horrorfest and received poor reviews from critics. She also starred in the direct-to-DVD releases Love and Mary and Remarkable Power.

Able appeared in a number of independent films before landing the leading role in the 2010 film Monsters, a low-budget sci-fi horror film. The movie was critically praised. In the same year, she had a role in Tales of an Ancient Empire. She ranked #83 on the Maxim magazine Hot 100 of 2008 list. In 2015, she starred in the independent feature-length thriller Dark, directed by Nick Basile.

In 2021 Able starred in We Won't Forget, a short film directed by Edgar Morais and Lucas Elliot Eberl and co-written by Able and both directors that had its world premiere in competition at Palm Springs International ShortFest. Whitney stars in the film as a woman whose frustrations boil to the surface while hosting a party for her friends, culminating in a public freakout that turns into collective hysteria. Edgar Morais, John Patrick Amedori, Paul James, Davida Williams and Caitlyn Folley also star in the film.

Personal life
Able married actor Scoot McNairy in June 2010. They have two children. On November 19, 2019, Able announced that they had divorced.

Filmography

Film

Television

References

External links 
 
 

1982 births
Living people
American film actresses
American television actresses
Actresses from Houston
21st-century American actresses